Sargassum pallidum is a species of seaweed native to East Asia and Southeast Asia. It belongs to the subgenus Bactrophycus, section Teretia of the genus Sargassum. Along with Sargassum fusiforme, S. pallidum is often dried and processed into a traditional Chinese medicine known as Hai Zao or Herba Sargassi.

References

Fucales